Kate Masur is an American historian and author. She is a professor of history at Northwestern University.

Her book Until Justice Be Done was a 2022 Pulitzer Prize finalist and winner of the American Historical Association's Littleton-Griswold Prize in US law and society, broadly defined.

Books
An Example for All the Land: Emancipation and the Struggle over Equality in Washington, D.C. (UNC Press, 2010)
(with Gregory Downs) The World the Civil War Made (UNC Press, 2015)
 (author of introduction) They Knew Lincoln, by John E. Washington (Oxford University Press, 2018)
Until Justice Be Done: America’s First Civil Rights Movement, from the Revolution to Reconstruction (W. W. Norton, 2021)

References

21st-century American women writers
Year of birth missing (living people)
Living people
21st-century American historians
American women historians
Northwestern University faculty